FX was an Indian affiliate of American FX entertainment TV channel, owned and produced by Fox International Channels and distributed by STAR India.

History 
FX India was launched during the month of September in 2012, with an HD feed following later, on 23 September 2015. The channel was closed down on 15 June 2017.

See also
 FX (Asia)
 Nat Geo Wild

References

India
Television channels and stations established in 2012
Television channels and stations disestablished in 2017
Mass media in Southeast Asia
Television stations in Mumbai
Defunct television channels in India